Periclimenes acanthimerus is a species of shrimp found in New Caledonia. It was first named by Alexander James Bruce in 2006.

References

Palaemonidae
Crustaceans described in 2006
Taxa named by Alexander James Bruce